Robert Louis Vogel (born September 23, 1941) is a former professional American football offensive lineman for the Baltimore Colts from 1963 to 1972. During that span he appeared in Super Bowl III and Super Bowl V for the Colts and was selected for the Pro Bowl five times. He played college football at Ohio State University. Vogel's football resume was very impressive. Played his Sr. year of high school in Massillon Washington High School, he earned first-team All-Ohio honors in 1958. After starring at Ohio State University, he was the fifth player chosen in the 1963 NFL Draft by the Baltimore Colts. Vogel protected Hall of Fame quarterback Johnny Unitas' blindside in Super Bowls III and V.

In 2021, the Professional Football Researchers Association named Vogel to the PFRA Hall of Very Good Class of 2021

References

 Bob Vogel (statistics & history) – Pro-Football-Reference.com
 Klingaman, Mike. "Catching Up With...former Colt Bob Vogel," The Baltimore Sun, Tuesday, September 1, 2009

1941 births
Living people
People from Toronto, Ohio
Sportspeople from Massillon, Ohio
Players of American football from Columbus, Ohio
American football offensive tackles
Ohio State Buckeyes football players
Baltimore Colts players
American Conference Pro Bowl players
Western Conference Pro Bowl players